

Warren Weir (born October 1989) is a retired Jamaican sprinter, who specialized in the 200 metres. He was the bronze medallist in the event at the 2012 London Olympics, helping Jamaica sweep the medals. In 2013 at the Moscow World Championships, Warren Weir won the silver medal equalling his personal best. He finished behind Usain Bolt who set a World Leading time. His personal best is 19.79 seconds set at the National Stadium in his home country Kingston, Jamaica. He has since equalled his personal best in Moscow, in the World Championship final. He trained with the Glen Mills-coached Racers Track Club, alongside Usain Bolt and Yohan Blake.

Career
At the start of his career, Weir competed in the short sprints and the 110 metres hurdles. Born in Trelawny Parish, he ran the 100 m and 200 m for Calabar High School at the Jamaican High School Championships. At the 2007 Jamaican junior championships he set a hurdles best of 13.65 seconds for second place and set a 100 m dash best of 10.69 seconds. He was a hurdles finalist at the 2007 Pan American Junior Athletics Championships and a silver medallist at the 2008 CARIFTA Games, where he also shared in the 4×100 metres relay gold medal. In his first appearance on the global stage, Weir reached the semi-finals at the 2008 World Junior Championships in Athletics. He competed sparingly in his first years as a senior, although he did run personal bests in the 100 m (10.50) and the 400 metres hurdles (53.28) in 2009.

Weir began to emerge as a 200 m specialist in 2011 after joining the Racers Track Club under coach Glen Mills. He and Mills noticed that the hurdles were leaving him with knee pain and both decided that Weir should focus on sprinting instead. He dipped under 21 second for the first time and placed sixth at the Jamaican Championships. He was invited to European meetings for the first time and performed well at his first Diamond League meeting, taking second place to Walter Dix with a personal best of 20.43 seconds into a strong headwind. He began 2012 by bringing his 200 m best down to 20.21, then 20.13 seconds. A time of 20.08 seconds brought him third place at the Adidas Grand Prix in New York in June.

At the Jamaican Olympic Trials in 2012, Weir broke twenty seconds with a personal best of 19.99 seconds in the 200 m semi final and a third-place finish in the final, behind Yohan Blake and Usain Bolt, earned him a spot on the Jamaican team for the 2012 Summer Olympics. In the Olympic 200 m final he was a surprise bronze medallist, securing a new personal best of 19.84 seconds in the process. His medal made it an all-Jamaican podium finish alongside fellow Racers Track Club athletes Bolt and Blake – the first time Jamaican men had achieved such a medal sweep at the Olympics.

Weir started out his 2013 season with a victory of 20.11 seconds in the Adidas Grand Prix in New York City. In June, he registered a 10.02 100m run, a massive personal best from his previous record of 10.51 seconds in 2008. Later in the 2013 Jamaican National Championships, Weir cruised to the finish line in the 200m final in 19.79 seconds, tying Bolt's world leading mark at that point. Having won the first two of his diamond league 200m races (in the Golden Grand Prix and the Adidas Grand Prix), Weir finished second to Bolt at the Meeting Areva, where Bolt set a world lead and meeting record of 19.73. Despite the clear loss to Bolt in Paris, Weir looked to be the closest to a challenger for Bolt at the World Championships that year. At the London Anniversary Games Weir clocked an impressive 19.89 and followed this up with a meeting record in the relay, clocking 37.75.

Come the 2013 World Championships in Athletics, Weir took the heats easily and made it to the final. In the final, Bolt won the race in a world leading time of 19.66 to become the first man to win the 200m at the world championships three times. Weir got clear silver at 19.79, equalling his best, and Curtis Mitchell the bronze in 20.04. Weir would later collect a gold in the 4 × 100 m, after running in the heats. Weir finished his season off by winning the 200m at the Memorial Van Damme in Brussels and hence won the Diamond League.

In 2014, Weir competed in the Commonwealth Games, running the 200m.  After winning his heats, Weir won the silver medal in the final.

He is known for saying "No English, straight Patois," sparking calls on social networks for T-shirts to be printed with the phrase.

In August 2017 Weir announced his retirement from competition via his Instagram account, after not advancing from the heats in the 200m at the 2017 World Championships in Athletics in London.

In a change of sport, Weir was a member of the Jamaica rugby sevens team that came third at the 2018 Central American and Caribbean Games.

Statistics

Personal bests
100 metres: 10.02 sec (2013)
200 metres: 19.79 sec (2013)
400 metres: 46.10 sec (2013)
110 metres hurdles (junior): 13.65 sec (2007)
400 metres hurdles: 53.28 sec (2009)

International competition record

References
 There are a variety of conflicting sources about his birthdate: the Jamaican Olympic Team profile lists 31 October, the 2012 Olympics profile has 13 October, and the IAAF profile has 21 October.

External links

London 2012 Profile 
Warren Weir at Racers Track Club

1989 births
Living people
Jamaican male sprinters
Athletes (track and field) at the 2012 Summer Olympics
Olympic athletes of Jamaica
Olympic bronze medalists for Jamaica
People from Trelawny Parish
Medalists at the 2012 Summer Olympics
Athletes (track and field) at the 2014 Commonwealth Games
Athletes (track and field) at the 2018 Commonwealth Games
World Athletics Championships athletes for Jamaica
World Athletics Championships medalists
Commonwealth Games silver medallists for Jamaica
Olympic bronze medalists in athletics (track and field)
Commonwealth Games medallists in athletics
World Athletics record holders (relay)
Diamond League winners
World Athletics Championships winners
People educated at Calabar High School
Medallists at the 2014 Commonwealth Games
Medallists at the 2018 Commonwealth Games